Cristián Iván Gaitán (born January 15, 1990 in Capitán Bermudez, Santa Fe, Argentina) is an Argentine footballer who plays as a midfielder for Cobreloa of the Chilean Primera División. He previously played for Estudiantes de La Plata (2004–2010), Unión de Santa Fe (2010–2011), Instituto de Córdoba (2011–2012) in Argentina and for Deportivo Cali (2013) in Colombia.

World Cup´s participations

National selection 

Teams

Honours

References
 
 

1990 births
Living people
Sportspeople from Santa Fe Province
Argentine footballers
Association football midfielders
Estudiantes de La Plata footballers
Unión de Santa Fe footballers
Instituto footballers
Cobreloa footballers
Deportivo Cali footballers
Chilean Primera División players
Argentine Primera División players
Paraguayan Primera División players
Argentine expatriate footballers
Argentine expatriate sportspeople in Chile
Expatriate footballers in Chile
Argentine expatriate sportspeople in Colombia
Expatriate footballers in Colombia
Argentine expatriate sportspeople in Paraguay
Expatriate footballers in Paraguay